The 1901 Open Championship was the 41st Open Championship, held 5–6 June at Muirfield in Gullane, East Lothian, Scotland. James Braid won the Championship, three strokes ahead of runner-up Harry Vardon. The Championship was a close contest between Braid, Vardon and J.H. Taylor with the leading amateur 11 strokes behind Braid and the next professional 16 strokes behind.

All entries played 36 holes on the first day with all those within 19 strokes of the leader making the cut and playing 36 holes on the final day, with the additional provision that the final day's field had to contain at least 32 professionals.

In a strong wind, Vardon led after the first round with a 77 and followed this with a 78. At the end of the first day, he was joined on 155 by Braid. Taylor was next, seven shots behind with James Kinnell and Jack White a further two strokes back. Such was the dominance of Braid and Vardon that only 36 players (31 professionals and five amateurs) scored 174 or better and the cut was made at 175 to include 33 professionals.

After the third round, Braid was five shots clear of Vardon, with Taylor two further shots behind and the rest of the field a further eight strokes behind. With a clear lead, he played a cautious final round of 80. With Braid having finished his round, Vardon had a chance to tie if he could play the last three holes in level fours. However at the 16th he topped his second shot, put his third into a bunker and took six, ending his chances. Taylor finished third with amateur Harold Hilton a further seven strokes behind. If not for a brutal 89 in the first round, Hilton would have fared much better on the final leaderboard.

First day leaderboard
Wednesday, 5 June 1901

Final leaderboard
Source:

Thursday, 6 June 1901

References

External links
Muirfield 1901 (Official site)

The Open Championship
Golf tournaments in Scotland
Open Championship
Open Championship
Open Championship